Elections are held in Haifa to elect the city's mayor. Currently, such elections are regularly scheduled to elect mayors to five-year terms.

Prior to 1978, mayors were selected by a vote of the city council. Since 1978, direct elections have been held for mayor.

1978
The 1978 Haifa mayoral election was held on 7 November 1978, and saw the election Aryeh Gur'el.

1983 
The 1983 Haifa mayoral election was held on 25 October 1983, and saw the reelection Aryeh Gur'el.

Gur'el's strongest opponent was Yael Rom, a pioneering female pilot in the Israeli Air Force. While she was a member of Likud, Rom ran for mayor in affiliation with an independent party list that was running in the coinciding city council elections.

1989
The 1989 Haifa mayoral election was held on 28 February 1989, and saw the reelection Aryeh Gur'el to a third consecutive term.

1993
The 1993 Haifa mayoral election was held on 2 November 1993, and saw the election of Amram Mitzna.

Labor Party primary
In the primary election for the Israeli Labor Party nomination, third-term incumbent mayor Aryeh Gur'el was defeated by challenger Amram Mitzna.

Mitzna won 63% of the vote to Gur'el's 37% in the primary, held on May 18, 1993. The primary campaign between the two had been tense.

After losing the primary, Gur'el announced that he would consider running in the general election as an independent candidate.

General election
Since Haifa was considered a stronghold of the Labor Party, Mitzna entered the general election as its front-runner.

1998
The 1998 Haifa mayoral election was held on 10 November 1998, and saw the reelection Amram Mitzna.

2003
The 2003 Haifa mayoral election was held on 28 October 2003 to elect the mayor of Haifa. It saw the election of Yona Yahav.

The election marked the first time that the Israeli Labor Party lost control of Haifa's mayoralty, as it and its predecessors had run the city since the 1940s. Haifa had been considered the party's most consistent stronghold. Labor was without a candidate, after their nominee, Aliza Shenhar, having poor support, dropped-out of the race three days before the election and endorsed Yahav. Yahav, who had formerly been a Labor member of the Knesset, ran a campaign affiliated with Shinui-Greens-Neighborhoods Union, which also ran a party list in the city council. Yahav had originally pursued Labor's nomination.

Likud nominee, retired general Shmuel Arad, had been considered the front-runner of the election. Arad received a greater vote share than any previous Likud mayoral candidate had ever received in Haifa. He had been expected to perform strongly in the city after Labor had Likud placed first in the city in the preceding 2003 Israeli legislative election, the first time in its history that the party had done so.

2008
The 2008 Haifa mayoral election was held on 11 November 2008 to elect the mayor of Haifa. It saw the reelection of Yona Yahav.

It was part of the 2008 Israeli municipal elections. Yahav defeated challenger Ya'acov Borovsky.

2013
The 2013 Haifa mayoral election was held on 22 October 2013 to elect the mayor of Haifa. It saw the reelection of Yona Yahav to a third consecutive term.

It was part of the 2013 Israeli municipal elections.

The city saw turnout exceeding 40%.

2018

The 2018 Haifa mayoral election was held on 30 October 2018 to elect the mayor of Haifa. It saw the election of Einat Kalisch-Rotem, who unseated incumbent mayor Yona Yahav. Kalisch-Rotem would become the first female mayor of Haifa, making Haifa the largest city in Israel, and first major Israeli city, to ever have a female mayor.

The election was part of the 2018 Israeli municipal elections.

Candidates
Avihu Han (Haifa Greens)
Einat Kalisch-Rotem (Living in Haifa), city council member, urban planner, teacher and 2013 mayoral candidate
Mendi Salzmann	(Haifa Awakens)
Israel Ya'akov Savyon (Lovers of Haifa)
Yona Yahav (Yona Yahav and Haifa's Youth), incumbent mayor since 2013

Results

References